Chenar-e Mishakhvor (also Romanized as Chenār-e Mīshākhvor and Chenār-e Mīshākhor; also known as Mīshākhor) is a village in Dowreh Rural District, Chegeni District, Dowreh County, Lorestan Province, Iran. At the 2006 census, its population was 169, in 40 families.

References 

Towns and villages in Dowreh County